Volodymyr Oleksiyovych Mykhailenko (born August 27, 1973) is a retired male decathlete from Ukraine, best known for winning the silver medal in the men's decathlon at the 2001 Summer Universiade.

Achievements

References
 2001 Year Ranking
 sports-reference

1973 births
Living people
Ukrainian decathletes
Athletes (track and field) at the 2000 Summer Olympics
Olympic athletes of Ukraine
Universiade medalists in athletics (track and field)
Universiade silver medalists for Ukraine
Medalists at the 2001 Summer Universiade